Radovan Nastić (1975), also known as Bensedin, is an American multimedia artist of a Serbian origin living in Los Angeles.  Nastić’s career as an active performance artist, author, photojournalist and radio host has made him world renowned.

Nastić, started his career in 1995 as a radio host on B92 radio, in the cult radio show Rhythm of the Heart All Star.  During this time he became a regular host on several radio shows including “Morning Program” “Rhythm of the Sports Heart” and “Loudspeaker - Urban Legends and Myths.”

The valuable work experience he gained with B92 Radio allowed him to establish himself as a renowned city journalist in Belgrade and across Serbia, providing him with the expertise to conceive and release his own radio show “Miniatures from Culture.”

After writing for Beorama, The Cultural Guide of Belgrade,  Nastić  published his first book titled Bensedin, composed of previously published short stories. To date, Nastić has published several books of the urban, avant-garde genre and is the author of numerous essays and articles which have been published in online sites such as  trablmejker.com, maniac.blog.hr and the Zrenjanin punk team, in addition to having a regular blog in the cultural section of the daily newspaper Glas javnosti.

Through his book  ...i napravim se da je sve u redu [and I pretend everything is fine] Nastić became the first author to publish a story about Merlinka, a famous tranvestite whose murder in 2003 caught national news headlines across Serbia and Montenegro.

In 2007, at the group exhibition 30 X 30 in the Cultural Center of Zrenjanin Nastić, presented the Serbian National Flag, an artwork composed of golden painkillers with the frame and background filled with used sedative boxes. The three flag colors were represented by one blue, one red, one white syringe defined as a dystopian concept of our present times.

At an exhibition entitled  Less Than Human in 2008, Nastić's text were covered by Croatian artist Tajana Sizdrak.

In 2021, Nastić provided Zrenjanin's Cultural Center an exhibition titled Hollywood through the haze - a presentation of photographs taken in Hollywood during 2012 depicting "his own experience of Hollywood reality where many individuals dream of becoming stars."
The strongest survive. ”

In 2022, Nastić's 2007 book Rejčel - ljubavna priča was published in English as Rachel - a love story by Portalibris. It is updated edition and with an English translation, which brings, as the title suggests, a Belgrade love story that follows the whirlwind of emotions, memories and doubts of the main character. He was looking for the meaning of life and finding out answers in classic films, musical hits, with pills and passionate encounters with his beloved  Rachel. In addition to the epilogue that already existed in the previous version, this one also contains a new one - Epilogue 2022, in which the author looks back on his work from a different perspective, while living in Los Angeles with a different life and makes some observations about contrasts of life between Serbia and the USA, about the past, the present and maturing... ... Instead of an afterword, the work also contains an emotional text about the artist Sasa Markovic - Mikrob (1959 - 2010), with whom the author was friends and who wrote a review for the first edition.

Today he lives and works in Los Angeles, USA.

Reception
Teofil Pančić has commented about the novels Bensedin and … and I pretend everything is fine:

Nastić is always "strong" - the reader can agree with him or not - when he publicly casts out personal demons (and I don't know anyone who does it in that way: non-calculative and rudely as he does), but it's not for throwing away even when write freely he sees and hears around him, things which irritates him or in any other way inspires him to comment, and this one varies from not very impressive post-adolescent angst and infantile defiantly "rightist" to really great observations that many conceited "society analysts" would sell the soul, only if they had it. The book is better partially than in full, but worth all the attention, because people like Radovan no longer grow here, and we will only feel the real lack of such people, when the dictatorship of uniform new generation young people completely prevails. And my favorite quote? Here it is: "I didn't look like an idiot at the time, but I was taking a run." Perfect!

Mikrob in the preface to Rachel, a love story says:
... As for emotions, they are your specialty. A hero with a broken heart and a burnt brain that stumbles through the ruins of our world. You're the one ... In fact, this book only talks about love, unhappy, vague, undefined. As I understood it, there was nothing from that relationship in the end. You could give me her phone number.

Ksenija Prodanović, reviewing The Day Mijatović Hit the Crossbar in Nedeljnik, wrote:
Those who listened to B92 radio in the 1990s remember Radovan Nastić thanks to the show" Sports Rhythm of the Heart "and the stories he published in " Beorama ". I have become fond of  him thanks to "Bensedin", the first book he published in 2005, and later the novel "Rachel, a love story", which may not be as good as it marked an important period in my life. Yet, aside from my preferences, Nastić is an interesting writer… ”adding that he is ".. an authentic city urban face who has no need to fake. What you see is what you get. Unfortunately, there are not many such people. That is why I am glad that the Belgrade Laguna published his new novel "The day when Mijatović hit the crossbar" because now the wider audience will have the opportunity to meet an ambivalent Caffetin lover. And you need to get to know him because he is fierce, exciting and interesting in his madness.

Dušan Nedeljković, reviewing ..Mijatović.. for Danas, wrote:

By publishing this novel, Radovan became the founder of a movement known for qualifying its members as "favorite losers". The dandy of the 21st century are the dignified heirs of the hippie movement. The grandchildren of Acid Eaters have grown up. They are angry, but they do not want to show aggression, they are harassing us with their creativity. In a flood of evil as a trend, a book like this brings back our faith in the peace & love & anarchy philosophy of life. If I were less nostalgic and not a middle-aged grumpy, I would declare this novel a masterpiece, but for now I will stop on the fact that Nastić's novel is exceptional. I personally miss this kind of narrative, I miss drinking beer with friends in front of Samiška, I miss the fan tribune. I miss more books like this. Thank God and the pills by the name Caffetin on Bensedin.More reviews:

Rackovic stressed that "Nastic's novel is a fantastic contribution to Serbian immigrant literature", while Dusan and Dusan recommended "everyone to read". "By targeting the goalposts themselves, Radovan Nastic spreads the truth around Los Angeles. Perpetually on the best part of society's margins, a man of very strong libido meets drag queens, gays, Sheki Turkovic and other small, and in fact great heroes of the planet," Cavic said, while Saponja noted that "the characters on the Hollywood fringe and situations from everyday life that Radovan describes are a real treasure for the reader and teleport them to a world where there is no place for faking it."

Bibliography
 2005 Bensedin (novel, Beorama, Belgrade)
 2006 ...i napravim se da je sve u redu [...and I pretend everything is fine] (novel, Red Box, Belgrade)
 2007 Rejčel - ljubavna priča [Rachel, a love story] (novel, Red Box, Belgrade)
 2007 Balkan Twilight (novel, KC Pančevo, Pančevo)
 2008 ...Niže nego ljudski [...less than human] (novel, Red Box, Belgrade)
 2008 Bensedin (2nd edition, Red Box, Belgrade)
 2008 Junaci urbane bede [Urban Poorness Heroes] (stories, Trablmejker, Belgrade)
 2009 Tri dana u Kinšasi [Three Days in Kinshasa] (novel, Red Box, Belgrade)
 2013 Svaki pas ima svoj dan [Every dog has its day] (novel, Prometej, Novi Sad)
 2018 Dan kada je Mijatović pogodio prečku: holivudska priča [The day Mijatović hit the crossbar: a Story of Hollywood] (novel, Laguna, Belgrade)
 2022 Rachel, a love story (novel, NEW edition, Portalibris, Belgrade)

Exhibitions

 2007 Zrenjanin, Serbia, Group Exhibition 30x30
 2008 Belgrade, Serbia, 2008, Exhibition Less than human
 2015 Los Angeles, USA, February, Group Exhibition Nu Art. New Artist at Wiznu Gallery, Street Art
 2015 Los Angeles, USA, February 20, 2015, Group Exhibition at 2nd Street Cigare Lounge and Gallery
 2019 Hollywood - Downtown, LA, USA, Art District Street Art Fair
 2021 Zrenjanin, Serbia, Hollywood trough the haze at Zrenjanin’s Cultural Center

References

External links 
 Official Instagram profile 
 Official Instagram profile

Living people
1975 births